Donald Marolf is a theoretical physicist, a Professor of Physics, and former head of the physics department at the University of California, Santa Barbara.

Biography
Marolf gained his Ph.D. from University of Texas at Austin in 1992, under  Bryce DeWitt with a thesis on  Green's Bracket Algebras and Their Quantization. His undergraduate-degree is from William Jewell College, in 1987. 
 
He is an expert on thermodynamics of black holes, gravitational aspects in string theory, classical- and quantum-gravity. In the past he has worked on the canonical approach to quantum-gravity, lower-dimensional models of quantum-gravity, issues related to quantization of diffeomorphism-invariant theories, and a number of other topics. He has published 113 scientific papers through 2007.

See also
 Firewall

References

External links
Official web page at UCSB
Online lecture: "Entropy Bounds: Can We Live Without Them? Dr. Don Marolf, UCSB"

21st-century American physicists
Living people
University of Texas at Austin College of Natural Sciences alumni
William Jewell College alumni
Theoretical physicists
University of California, Santa Barbara faculty
Year of birth missing (living people)
Fellows of the American Physical Society